This is a list of years in Sweden.

16th century

17th century

18th century

19th century

20th century

21st century

See also
 Timeline of Swedish history
 Timeline of Stockholm history
 List of years by country

 
Years
Sweden